Hristifor Račanin (c. 1595 – 1670) was a Serbian scribe working on ornately decorated manuscripts. He is best known for Psaltir s posledovanjem, written in 1645. He was the abbot of the Rača monastery on the Drina River.

The Museum of the Serbian Orthodox Church is in possession of a small number of ornately decorated (illuminated) manuscripts by unknown scribes, though a few have been identified, namely Priest-Monk Hristifor Račanin. His name has been preserved in the manuscripts in the Museum collection.
 
Born in the 1670s, Hristifor would soon enter the monastery seeking knowledge. A Serbian monastery in the eighteenth century was considered the bastion of learning. In fact, the Eastern Orthodox Church was a manifestation of knowledge and learning at a time when a torrent of Turkish invaders swept the Balkans.

Hristifor nowadays scarcely earns a mention by historians of literature. In his day, however, he was much read in Serbia and Imperial Russia. In 1688 during the Austro-Turkish wars, when the ousted Turks were recovering and advancing toward Rača Monastery, near the Drina River, the abbot called for a general evacuation. Hristifor and other monks packed up and left to join their compatriots in northern Serbia. Maximilian II Emanuel, Elector of Bavaria led the capture of Belgrade in 1688 from the Ottomans, with the full support of Serbian insurgents under the command of Jovan Monasterlija.
 
Literary critic Jovan Skerlić gives credit to Kiprijan Račanin, Jerotej Račanin, Ćirjak Račanin, Grigorije Račanin, Simeon Račanin, Teodor Račanin, Gavril Stefanović Venclović (also called Račanin) and Hristifor Račanin for keeping Serbian literature alive after Serbia's occupation by the Turks. In 1668, he transcribed Teodosije's Service to St. Petar of Koriša now preserved in its entirety in the Collection of Baltazar Bogišić at Cavtat. All this led up to the Great Turkish War where Serbian volunteers joined the Austrian army in the thousands to defeat the Turks from invading Europe. Yet, both the Ottoman and Austrian empires, lorded over Serbian lands until 1912 when the Turks were finally removed from the Balkan Peninsula and 1918 with the disintegration of the Austro-Hungarian Empire.

See also
Čirjak Račanin (1660–1731), Serbian Orthodox monk and writer
Kiprijan Račanin (1650–1730), Serbian Orthodox monk and writer
Jerotej Račanin (1650–1727), Serbian Orthodox monk and writer
Teodor Račanin (1500–1560), Serbian Orthodox monk and writer
Simeon Račanin ( 1676–1700), Serbian Orthodox monk and writer
Gavrilo Stefanović Venclović, Kiprijan's student.
Grigorije Račanin
Jefrem Janković Tetovac
Prohor Račanin

References

Sources
 

17th-century Serbian people
Serbian abbots
Serbian writers